Group 2 of the 1930 FIFA World Cup began on 14 July 1930 and concluded on 20 July 1930. Yugoslavia won the group, and advanced to the semi-finals. Brazil and Bolivia failed to advance.

Standings

Matches

Yugoslavia vs Brazil

|
|valign="top" width="50%"|

|}

Yugoslavia vs Bolivia
{{#invoke:transcludable section|main|section=2-2|text={{football box
|date = 17 July 1930
|time = 12:45 UYT (UTC−03:30)
|team1 = 
|score = 4–0
|report = Report
|team2 = 
|goals1 = Bek Marjanović Vujadinović |stadium = Estadio Parque Central, Montevideo
|attendance = 18,306
|referee = Francisco Mateucci (Uruguay)
}}}}

|
|valign="top" width="50%"|

|}

Brazil vs Bolivia

|
|valign="top" width="50%"|

|}

References

Group 2
Group
Group
Group